The Sally Young LM–1500 Pairs bridge event is held at the Summer American Contract Bridge League (ACBL) North American Bridge Championship. It is open to all players who have earned Life Master status up to 1,500 masterpoints.
The event is held at the same time as the Von Zedtwitz Life Master Pairs (open to all Life Masters) and the
Bruce LM-5000 Pairs event.

The trophy is named in honor of Sally Young (1906-1970), the first woman to achieve Life Master status in the ACBL (and #17 overall).

Winners

Sources

List of previous winners, Page 5

2009 winners, Page 1

External links
ACBL official website

North American Bridge Championships